The Mannie Ramjohn Stadium, located in Marabella, San Fernando, Trinidad and Tobago, is named for long-distance runner Manny Ramjohn, the first person to win a gold medal for Trinidad and Tobago in a major international sporting event.  The stadium was constructed for the 2001 FIFA U-17 World Cup which was hosted by Trinidad and Tobago. It also hosted games from the 2010 FIFA U-17 Women's World Cup.

References

Buildings and structures in San Fernando, Trinidad and Tobago
Football venues in Trinidad and Tobago